Tefik Osmani (born 8 June 1985) is an Albanian professional football official and a former centre-back. He is the sporting director for Albanian club Tirana.

Club career

Early career
Osmani started his career with his local club Skënderbeu Korçë as a teenager where he worked his way through the youth ranks and joined the first team prior to the 2002–03 season, where the club was competing in the Albanian Second Division, the third tier of Albanian football. He left the team after one season and joined Albanian First Division side Tomori Berat where he would stay for one year before leaving at the end of the season to join Albanian Superliga side Elbasani. Upon joining the club he became a key member of the squad and made 36 league appearances and scored twice to help the club finish as runners up in the league behind Tirana.

Following a decent second season with Tirana, he was given offers from other clubs in Albania and abroad. Most notably two unnamed clubs from Switzerland, both in the top flight. However he needed to talk to his manager and the owner of KF Tirana Refik Halili to sort out his current contract with the club.

Teuta Durrës
On 23 July 2011 he joined Teuta Durrës on a one-year contract.

Vllaznia Shkodër
Osmani signed for Vllaznia Shkodër on 16 July 2012 and was presented to the media in the very same day. He was part of the team only in the first part of 2012–13 season, collecting 13 league matches and scoring one goal. Osmani left the club during the winter transfer window in controversial fashion.

Teuta Durrës return
In January 2013, he returned to Teuta Durrës for the second part of 2012–13 season. He made his return debut on 10 February in the matchday 14 against Shkumbini Peqin, netting his side second goal in an eventual 3–0 home win.

Skënderbeu Korçë
On 29 May 2014, Osmani signed a one-year contract with his boyhood club Skënderbeu Korçë; he was presented along with Bernard Berisha, and was handed squad number 17. Shortly after, he traveled with the team in Austria for the preparation phase ahead of UEFA Champions League tie against BATE Borisov. Osmani was included in the Mirel Josa's squad list.

On 15 July, in the first leg of the second qualifying round, Osmani made an overall good performance, helping Skënderbeu Korçë to get a clean sheet at Borisov Arena. In the returning leg one week later, Osmani was again in the starting lineup, with Skënderbeu who didn't get more than a 1–1 draw at home, eliminated thus from the competition due to away goal rule.

Osmani started the domestic season by winning his first silverware with the club, the Albanian Supercup, as Skënderbeu Korçë defeated Flamurtari Vlorë at Qemal Stafa Stadium thanks to a Bakary Nimaga winner.

On 23 February 2015, during the league match against Kukësi, Osmani suffered an injury and was substituted in the 15th minute for Leonit Abazi, with the match finishing 1–1. Following the match, it was reported that he had suffered a strain injury in his right thigh that kept him outside the field for one month. He returned in action on 13 April by playing the full-90 minutes during the 5–2 thrashing of Partizani Tirana at Skënderbeu Stadium.

On 8 July 2015, Osmani agreed a contract extension with Skënderbeu Korçë, signing a contract until June 2016. He renewed the contract in the airplane while he was traveling back to Albania with the rest of the squad, becoming the first player in history to do so.

During 2016–17 season, Osmani made 26 league appearances, including 5 cup appearances and one in Albanian Supercup where the team was defeated by Kukësi. On 20 May 2017, during the decisive match against Kukësi for the championship, Osmani along with other teammates were included in a massive brawl with referee Enea Jorgji which sent him off for unsportsmanlike conduct. Everything started in the 59th minute when the referee didn't give a clear penalty to Skënderbeu after a foul inside the zone on Liridon Latifi, instead booking him for diving. Skënderbeu eventually were defeated 2–0 at Zeqir Ymeri Stadium, meaning that they have failed to win the championship for the first time in six years. Disciplinary Committee of AFA handed him an eight-game ban for all domestic competitions.

Second Teuta Durrës return
On 4 August 2018, after weeks of speculation about his future, Osmani decided to return to Teuta Durrës by signing a one-year contract. The manager Bledi Shkëmbi, who was also his former teammate at Skënderbeu and Partizani, decided to make Osmani the team captain for the 2018–19 season. Osmani begun the season on 19 August by playing full-90 minutes and helping the team get a clean-sheet in the goalless draw against Flamurtari Vlorë.

Osmani left Teuta in July 2019 after his side was eliminated from 2019–20 UEFA Europa League first qualifying round by Ventspils.

Tirana return
On 20 July 2019, Tirana announced to have signed Osmani on a deal until 2020, with the player marking his return to the capital side for the first time since 2011.

International career
Osmani has represented Albania national team in 12 occasions, making his debut in a February 2005 FIFA World Cup qualification match against Ukraine. His final international was a June 2013 World Cup qualification match against Norway.

Style of play
Osmani main position is centre-back. Since the beginning of 2017, under manager Ilir Daja, Osmani begun utilised as a defensive midfielder.

Career statistics

Club

International

Honours
Elbasani
Albanian Superliga: 2005–06

Tirana
Albanian Superliga: 2008–09, 2019–20
Albanian Cup: 2010–11

Skënderbeu Korçë
Albanian Superliga: 2014–15, 2015–16, 2017–18
Albanian Cup: 2017–18
Albanian Supercup: 2014

References

External links

1985 births
Living people
Footballers from Korçë
Albanian footballers
Association football central defenders
Albania international footballers
Albania under-21 international footballers
Albania youth international footballers
KF Skënderbeu Korçë players
FK Tomori Berat players
KF Elbasani players
FC Metalurh Zaporizhzhia players
FK Partizani Tirana players
KF Tirana players
KF Teuta Durrës players
KF Vllaznia Shkodër players
Kategoria e Parë players
Kategoria Superiore players
Ukrainian Premier League players
Albanian expatriate footballers
Expatriate footballers in Ukraine
Albanian expatriate sportspeople in Ukraine
Albanian football managers
KF Tirana managers
Kategoria Superiore managers